Esther Gwendolyn "Stella" Bowen (1893–1947) was an Australian artist and writer.

Early career

Bowen was born in North Adelaide, an inner suburb of Adelaide, South Australia, and educated at Tormore House School. As a young girl, Bowen enjoyed drawing and convinced her mother to allow her to study with Margaret Preston. However, her desire to pursue art training in Melbourne was thwarted by the ill health of her mother and the latter's reluctance to let her daughter follow such a career. When her mother died in 1914, Bowen left for England with a return ticket and an allowance of £20 per month. In cosmopolitan London, she studied at the Westminster School of Art and mixed with a company of writers, artists, poets and political activists.

Early in 1918, Bowen met and fell in love with the writer Ford Madox Ford. She was 24, he was 44. The couple fled to rural England where their daughter Julia was born in 1920. However, by 1922, the family were fed up with the hardships of life in the English countryside and moved temporarily to France. They soon decided to remain in France and moved to Paris.

Caught up in the bohemian café society of Paris, Ford started a literary magazine and was a leading figure among the expatriate writers. Bowen, meanwhile, found her first studio but managed little time for painting in between attending to the needs of Ford and their daughter.

Later years

Bowen separated from Ford in 1927. It was a difficult time for her but it did give her the time and space to pursue her art. She began to gain some portrait commissions but still struggled to earn enough money. In 1932, she went to the United States at the invitation of the poet Ramon Guthrie, who helped her in finding commissions including, among others, with Sinclair Lewis. When she returned to France she found she could not afford to remain in Paris and returned to England on her fortieth birthday. – She described her month-long stay of 1936 in Cagnes-sur-Mer with Ross and Tusnelda Sanders in her autobiography, Drawn From Life and also painted depictions of her life there.

Although Bowen continued to paint she did not earn enough from painting and commissions to make ends meet and for many years supplemented her income by writing an art review column in the News Chronicle and teaching. Because of her relationship with Ford Madox Ford she was given an advance to write a biography and produced Drawn from life: a memoir. This book came out to glowing reviews.

World War II – war artist

The Second World War brought a new chapter in Bowen's career. In 1944, she was appointed an official war artist by the Australian War Memorial. Theaden Brocklebank, a producer with the Pacific service of the BBC and wife of William Keith Hancock, had arranged for Stella Bowen to record regular talks for Australian audiences about her wartime experiences.  These talks provided Bowen with additional income during a difficult time and they resulted in the offer of the position of war artist.

Bowen's brief as a war artist was to depict the activities of the Royal Australian Air Force (RAAF) stationed in England. She also painted portraits of military commanders and Australian prisoners of war who had recently been repatriated from Europe. One of the early women artists to be appointed, Bowen completed her last painting in 1947. She died later that year of breast and liver cancer, having never returned to Australia.

Two portraits by Bowen are in the National Portrait Gallery collection, George Douglas Howard Cole and Dame Margaret Isabel Cole. Her portrait of Ramon Guthrie done in Paris in the 1920s is in the collection of the Hood Museum of Dartmouth College.

A painting of Admiral Sir Ragnar Colvin painted in 1944 is held by the Australian War Memorial.

Publications 
Drawn from Life : A Memoir  (1940) (reprinted Pan Macmillan, 1999)

Stella Bowen Park

Stella Bowen Park is located within Park 26 of the Adelaide Park Lands between the Adelaide Oval and North Adelaide.

References

External links

 Rebels, Stella Bowen Interview by George Negus with Suzanne Brookman, Stella Bowen's niece, and Lola Wilkins, Curator of the Australian War Memorial exhibition, 21 October 2002
 Australian Artist – Bowen, Stella (1893-1947) Canadian War Museum (Retrieved 18 December 2022)

1893 births
1947 deaths
20th-century Australian painters
20th-century Australian women artists
Alumni of the Westminster School of Art
Australian expatriates in England
Australian war artists
Australian women painters
Australian women writers
Australian writers
Deaths from cancer in England
Deaths from colorectal cancer
Writers from Adelaide
Artists from Adelaide
World War II artists